Lead(II) oxide, also called lead monoxide, is the inorganic compound with the molecular formula PbO. PbO occurs in two polymorphs: litharge having a tetragonal crystal structure, and massicot having an orthorhombic crystal structure. Modern applications for PbO are mostly in lead-based industrial glass and industrial ceramics, including computer components. It is an amphoteric oxide.

Types 
Lead oxide exists in two types:

 Red tetragonal (α-PbO), obtained at lower temperatures than the β-PbO
 Yellow orthorhombic (β-PbO), which is obtained temperatures higher than

Synthesis
At this temperature it is also the end product of decomposition of other oxides of lead in air:
PbO2->[{293 °C}] Pb12O19 ->[{351 °C}]  Pb12O17 ->[{375 °C}] Pb3O4 ->[{605 °C}] PbO

Thermal decomposition of lead(II) nitrate or lead(II) carbonate also results in the formation of PbO:
2  → 2 PbO + 4  + 
 → PbO + 

PbO is produced on a large scale as an intermediate product in refining raw lead ores into metallic lead. The usual lead ore is galena (lead(II) sulfide). At a temperature of around  the sulfide is converted to the oxide:
2 PbS + 3  → 2 PbO + 2

From lead 
There are two principal methods to make lead monoxide both of which resemble combustion of the lead at high temperature:
Barton pot method.
The refined molten lead droplets are oxidized in a vessel under a forced air flow which carries them out to the separation system (e.g. cyclonic separators) for further processing. Oxides produced by this method are mostly a mixture of α-PbO and β-PbO. The overall reaction is:22PbO

Ball mill method The lead balls are oxidized in a cooled rotating drum. The oxidation is achieved by collisions of the balls. Just like in Barton pot method, the supply of air and separators may also be used.

Structure
As determined by X-ray crystallography, both polymorphs, tetragonal and orthorhombic feature a pyramidal four-coordinate lead center. In the tetragonal form the four lead–oxygen bonds have the same length, but in the orthorhombic two are shorter and two longer. The pyramidal nature indicates the presence of a stereochemically active lone pair of electrons. When PbO occurs in tetragonal lattice structure it is called litharge; and when the PbO has orthorhombic lattice structure it is called massicot. The PbO can be changed from massicot to litharge or vice versa by controlled heating and cooling. The tetragonal form is usually red or orange color, while the orthorhombic is usually yellow or orange, but the color is not a very reliable indicator of the structure. The tetragonal and orthorhombic forms of PbO occur naturally as rare minerals.

Reactions
Metallic lead is obtained by reducing PbO with carbon monoxide at around :
PbO + CO → Pb + 

The red and yellow forms of this material are related by a small change in enthalpy:
PbO(red) → PbO(yellow)  ΔH = 1.6 kJ/mol

PbO is amphoteric, which means that it reacts with both acids and with bases. With strong bases, PbO dissolves to form plumbite (also called plumbate(II)) salts:
PbO +  +  →

Applications
The kind of lead in lead glass is normally PbO, and PbO is used extensively in making glass. Depending on the glass, the benefit of using PbO in glass can be one or more of increasing the refractive index of the glass, decreasing the viscosity of the glass, increasing the electrical resistivity of the glass, and increasing the ability of the glass to absorb X-rays. Adding PbO to industrial ceramics (as well as glass) makes the materials more magnetically and electrically inert (by raising their Curie temperature) and it is often used for this purpose. Historically PbO was also used extensively in ceramic glazes for household ceramics, and it is still used, but not extensively any more. Other less dominant applications include the vulcanization of rubber and the production of certain pigments and paints. PbO is used in cathode ray tube glass to block X-ray emission, but mainly in the neck and funnel because it can cause discoloration when used in the faceplate. Strontium oxide and Barium oxide are preferred for the faceplate.

The consumption of lead, and hence the processing of PbO, correlates with the number of automobiles, because it remains the key component of automotive lead–acid batteries.

Niche or declining uses
A mixture of PbO with glycerine sets to a hard, waterproof cement that has been used to join the flat glass sides and bottoms of aquariums, and was also once used to seal glass panels in window frames. It is a component of lead paints.

PbO was one of the raw materials for century eggs, a type of Chinese preserved egg. but it has been gradually replaced due to health problems. It was an unscrupulous practice in some small factories but it became rampant in China and forced many honest manufacturers to label their boxes "lead-free" after the scandal went mainstream in 2013.

In powdered tetragonal litharge form, it can be mixed with linseed oil and then boiled to create a weather-resistant sizing used in gilding. The litharge would give the sizing a dark red color that made the gold leaf appear warm and lustrous, while the linseed oil would impart adhesion and a flat durable binding surface.

PbO is used in certain condensation reactions in organic synthesis.

PbO is the input photoconductor in a video camera tube called the Plumbicon.

Health issues

Lead oxide may be fatal if swallowed or inhaled. It causes irritation to skin, eyes, and respiratory tract. It affects gum tissue, the central nervous system, the kidneys, the blood, and the reproductive system. It can bioaccumulate in plants and in mammals.

References

External links
Case Studies in Environmental Medicine - Lead Toxicity
ToxFAQs: Lead
National Pollutant Inventory - Lead and Lead Compounds Fact Sheet
Webelements PbO

Amphoteric compounds
Lead(II) compounds
Oxides